Nemoraea is a genus of flies in the family Tachinidae.

Species
Species within this genus include:

 Nemoraea acutangularis
 Nemoraea angustecarinata
 Nemoraea appendiculata
 Nemoraea bequaerti
 Nemoraea bifurca
 Nemoraea bipartita
 Nemoraea brasiliensis
 Nemoraea capensis
 Nemoraea chrysophora
 Nemoraea discoidalis
 Nemoraea dotata
 Nemoraea echinata
 Nemoraea elegantula
 Nemoraea fasciata
 Nemoraea fenestrata
 Nemoraea fortuna
 Nemoraea grandis
 Nemoraea infoederata
 Nemoraea japonica
 Nemoraea javana
 Nemoraea lateralis
 Nemoraea longicornis
 Nemoraea mendax
 Nemoraea metallica
 Nemoraea minor
 Nemoraea mira
 Nemoraea miranda
 Nemoraea moerens
 Nemoraea mutata
 Nemoraea natalensis
 Nemoraea nigra
 Nemoraea nigroscutellata
 Nemoraea ornata
 Nemoraea paulla
 Nemoraea pellucida
 Nemoraea pictipennis
 Nemoraea piligena
 Nemoraea rubellana
 Nemoraea rutilioides
 Nemoraea sapporensis
 Nemoraea semiobscura
 Nemoraea takanoi
 Nemoraea titan
 Nemoraea triangulata
 Nemoraea unicolor
 Nemoraea vagabunda
 Nemoraea varia
 Nemoraea watanabei
 Nemoraea viridifulva
 Nemoraea vulgata

References

Diptera of Europe
Tachininae
Tachinidae genera
Taxa named by Jean-Baptiste Robineau-Desvoidy